Radio Italia TV is an Italian music television channel, owned and operated by Gruppo Radio Italia (which own also Radio Italia Solo Musica Italiana), available on the digital terrestrial television network in Italy since 2011. On 31 December 2012 Video Italia ceased broadcasting and merged with the digital terrestrial channel Radio Italia TV.

Specialized in easy listening Italian music, Radio Italia TV was launched on April 2004, but has been closed in 2005 and survived as syndication network along with its satellite counterpart when was closed in July 2009. The channel was re-launched in 2011 by its owner, again on the digital terrestrial television network.

External links 
  (in Italian)

Music television channels
Italian-language television stations
Television channels and stations established in 2004
Television channels in Italy
Music organisations based in Italy